Aubrey Leon McDade Jr. (born July 29, 1981) is a retired United States Marine who was awarded the Navy Cross for his actions in the Iraq War, in which he rescued two U.S. Marines during an enemy ambush during the Second Battle of Fallujah, in November 2004. He is the fifteenth U.S. Marine to receive the Navy Cross in the Global War on Terrorism.

Early life and education
McDade enlisted in the U.S. Marine Corps in November 1999, after graduating from Western Hills High School in Fort Worth, Texas.

Career

McDade's first tour of duty in the Iraq War was from March 2003, to October 2003. He returned to Iraq for a second deployment from June 2004 through February 2005.

Second Battle of Fallujah
On the night of November 11, 2004, during the Second Battle of Fallujah, McDade was a machine gun squad leader with 1st Battalion, 8th Marines, 2nd Marine Division, attached at the time to the Regimental Combat Team 7 (RCT 7) when his squad was attacked and pinned down by small arms and machine gun fire in an alley that injured three Marines. McDade, in the rear, rushed to the front of his squad to direct machine gun fire at the attackers. Under fire, McDade then rescued two of the wounded Marines, one at a time. The third Marine was killed in the attack and his body was recovered. McDade was originally awarded the Silver Star for his action; the award was subsequently upgraded to the Navy Cross.

Navy Cross
On January 19, 2007, Staff Sergeant McDade was presented with the Navy Cross during a recruit graduation ceremony at Marine Corps Recruit Depot Parris Island where he served as a drill instructor for 1st Recruit Training Battalion, Charlie Company.

On January 23, 2007, SSgt. McDade was the guest of First Lady Laura Bush at the State of the Union Address.

Decorations

  Navy Cross
  Navy and Marine Corps Achievement Medal
  Combat Action Ribbon
  Navy Unit Commendation
  Marine Corps Good Conduct Medal
  Iraq Campaign Medal
  Global War on Terrorism Expeditionary Medal
  Global War On Terrorism Service Medal
  Humanitarian Service Medal
Navy Sea Service Deployment Ribbon

See also

Notes

References

External links
 McDade guest of Laura Bush at the State of the Union Address.

1981 births
Living people
United States Marines
Recipients of the Navy Cross (United States)
People from Fort Worth, Texas
African-American United States Navy personnel
21st-century African-American people
20th-century African-American people